Lyutibrod Rocks (‘Lyutibrodski Skali’ \'lyu-ti-brod-ski ska-'li\) is the chain of rocks off the northwest coast of Low Island in the South Shetland Islands extending 860 m in east-west direction.

The feature is named after the settlement of Lyutibrod in northwestern Bulgaria.

Location

See also
 List of Antarctic and subantarctic islands

Maps
 South Shetland Islands: Smith and Low Islands. Scale 1:150000 topographic map No. 13677. British Antarctic Survey, 2009.
Antarctic Digital Database (ADD). Scale 1:250000 topographic map of Antarctica. Scientific Committee on Antarctic Research (SCAR). Since 1993, regularly upgraded and updated.

References
 Lyutibrod Rocks. SCAR Composite Antarctic Gazetteer.
 Bulgarian Antarctic Gazetteer. Antarctic Place-names Commission. (details in Bulgarian, basic data in English)

External links
 Lyutibrod Rocks. Copernix satellite image

Rock formations of the South Shetland Islands
Bulgaria and the Antarctic